Argentina Menis (19 July 1948 – 3 March 2023) was a Romanian discus thrower who won silver medals at the 1972 Summer Olympics in. Munich and 1974 European Athletics Championships. She finished sixth at the 1976 Olympics. On 23 September 1972, she set a world record that stood for eight months. After retiring from competitions she worked at her club Dinamo București.

Menis died on 3 March 2023, at the age of 74.

References

External links 
 
 
 
 

1948 births
2023 deaths
Romanian female discus throwers
Sportspeople from Craiova
Athletes (track and field) at the 1972 Summer Olympics
Athletes (track and field) at the 1976 Summer Olympics
Olympic athletes of Romania
Olympic silver medalists for Romania
World record setters in athletics (track and field)
European Athletics Championships medalists
Medalists at the 1972 Summer Olympics
Olympic silver medalists in athletics (track and field)
Universiade medalists in athletics (track and field)
Universiade silver medalists for Romania
Medalists at the 1973 Summer Universiade
Medalists at the 1975 Summer Universiade